Honeyman may refer to:

In people:
 Aaron Honeyman (born 1972), Australian basketball player
Andrew Honeyman, Bishop of Orkney 1664-76
 Ben Honeyman (born 1977), Australian former football (soccer) player
George Honeyman (born 1994), English footballer
 James Honeyman-Scott (1956 – 1982), commonly referred to as "Jimmy", English rock guitarist, songwriter 
 John Honeyman (1729 - 1822), American spy and British Loyalist double agent
John Honeyman (1831-1914), architect, partner in Honeyman and Keppie
 Katrina Honeyman (1950-2011), British economic historian
 Nan Wood Honeyman (1881 – 1970), American politician 
 Tom Honeyman (1891–1971), director of the Glasgow Art Gallery
 Victoria Honeyman (born 1978), British politics academic

In places:
 Honeyman Island, Nunavut, Canada

In other uses:
 Honeyman: Live 1973, album by Tim Buckley
 Jessie M. Honeyman Memorial State Park, Florence, Oregon, USA
 "Honeyman"; a song written and sung by Cat Stevens and Elton John (1971)

See also 
 Honyman